There are two species of snake named Antilles racer:

 Alsophis antillensis, endemic to the Caribbean island of Guadeloupe
 Alsophis sibonius, endemic to the Caribbean island of Dominica

Set index articles on snakes